The Allwyn, or Allwin (sources show differing spellings) was a British cyclecar manufactured by Allwyn Cyclecars in Bournemouth, Hampshire, in 1920. 

It had an air-cooled engine with either chain or belt drive to the rear axle which had no differential.

See also
 List of car manufacturers of the United Kingdom

Vintage vehicles
Cyclecars
Defunct motor vehicle manufacturers of England
Companies based in Bournemouth